David Francis Kessler, OBE, (6 June 1906 - 24 November 1999) was a British publisher and author. He was the managing director of The Jewish Chronicle.

Early life
David Kessler was born on 6 June 1906 in Pretoria, South Africa. His father, Leopold Kessler, was a friend of Theodor Herzl, an early proponent of Zionism, and a shareholder of The Jewish Chronicle.

Kessler was educated at Leighton Park School in Reading before graduating from the University of Cambridge, where he earned a bachelor's degree in law and economics.

Career
Kessler began his career by working for Antonin Besse, an oil and shipping businessman with ties to the Royal Dutch Shell in Aden, Yemen. He subsequently worked for the Palestine Potash Company, later known as the Dead Sea Works, in Jerusalem.

Kessler became the managing director of The Jewish Chronicle in London in 1935. In 1946, he dismissed the editor, Ivan Greenberg, who was deemed too divisive. Instead, he appointed John Maurice Shaftesley, who remained in the post until 1958, when he hired William Frankel.

Kessler wrote two books. He was a founding member of the Minority Rights Group. He served as the chairman of the Falasha Welfare Association and the Wiener Library in London. He became OBE in 1996.

Personal life and death
Kessler had a wife, Matilda, a son, and three daughters. They resided in Stoke Hammond, Buckinghamshire, England, where he died on 24 November 1999.

Works

Further reading

References

1906 births
1999 deaths
People from Pretoria
People from Buckinghamshire
British Jews
Alumni of the University of Cambridge
Publishers (people) from London
Officers of the Order of the British Empire
20th-century English businesspeople